This is a list of Estonian television related events from 1994.

Events
26 February - Silvi Vrait is selected to represent Estonia at the 1994 Eurovision Song Contest with her song "Nagu merelaine". She is selected to be the first Estonian Eurovision entry during Eurolaul held at the Linnahall in Tallinn.
30 April - Estonia enters the Eurovision Song Contest for the first time with "Nagu merelaine" performed by Silvi Vrait.

Debuts

Television shows

1990s
Õnne 13 (1993–present)

Ending this year

Births

Deaths

See also
 1994 in Estonian football
 1994 in Estonia